Vatel may refer to:

 François Vatel (1631–1671), French chef and majordomo
 Françoise Vatel (1937–2005), French actress
 Vatel (film), a historical-drama film about François Vatel
 , a hotel and tourism business school

See also 
 Emer de Vattel (1714–1767), Swiss philosopher, diplomat and legal expert